Francis Xavier Aschenbrenner (July 12, 1925 – January 30, 2012) was a professional American football player for the Chicago Hornets and the Montreal Alouettes.

Early years
Aschenbrenner was born Francis Xavier Aschenbrenner on July 12, 1925, in Germany. At the age of 3, he boarded a steamship with his parents to begin their life in the United States and moved to Milwaukee. He started his college football career at Marquette University, until the outbreak of World War II.

During the war, Aschenbrenner served in the United States Naval Air Corps. While training at the University of North Carolina at Chapel Hill in 1944, Aschenbrenner also played football there. In 1945, he played for the service team at the Great Lakes Naval Training Center under Paul Brown who also coached the Cleveland Browns. He later played on the team under Lynn Waldorf and Bear Bryant.

Professional career
After the war, Aschenbrenner was drafted in the sixth round of the 1947 NFL Draft by the Pittsburgh Steelers and also in the first round of the 1947 AAFC Draft by the Buffalo Bills. Aschenbrenner, however, returned to college to finish his education at Northwestern University and never played for the Steelers or Bills.

In fact, his rights were traded by both teams with the Steelers sending him to the Los Angeles Rams and the Bills to the Cleveland Browns. Meanwhile, Aschenbrenner became a star at Northwestern and played in the 1949 Rose Bowl, where he was named the outstanding player in the game, running for 119 yards, which included a 73-yard dash for a touchdown to open the scoring.  Aschenbrenner's rights in the AAFC had been traded by Cleveland to the Chicago Hornets. Aschenbrenner played six games for Chicago in 1949, but the team had tried to convert him to defense, where he had never played before. The experiment proved a failure and he was soon released.

Aschenbrenner then spent another two years in the Navy Air Corps before a brief four game stint with the Montreal Alouettes of the Canadian Football League in 1951.

In 1993, Aschenbrenner was inducted into the Rose Bowl Hall of Fame, along with Bo Schembechler and O. J. Simpson. He died on January 30, 2012, in Arizona.

References

1925 births
2012 deaths
American football halfbacks
Chicago Hornets players
Great Lakes Navy Bluejackets football players
Marquette Golden Avalanche football players
Montreal Alouettes players
North Carolina Tar Heels football players
North Carolina Pre-Flight Cloudbusters football players
Northwestern Wildcats football players
German players of American football
United States Navy personnel of World War II